Basat Öztürk (born 7 December 1963) is a Turkish diplomat. He has served as Ambassador to NATO since 15 November 2018.

Early life 

Basat Öztürk was born in Elazığ on 7 December 1963. He graduated from Ankara University, Faculty of Political Sciences in 1985. In 1996 he enrolled into the NATO Defense College.

Career 
After graduating from university in 1985, he entered the Ministry of Foreign Affairs serving as the third secretary and attache in the NATO department. From 1989 and 1994 he served in the Turkish embassy in Tehran and the consulate in Chicago. He then served in the Ministry of Foreign Affairs in several NATO related positions until 2000.

Öztürk served as Consul General in Alexandria between 2002 and 2004. From 2004 he was involved with the Ministry of Foreign Affairs assuming the position as its Deputy Director-General of Maritime and Aviation from 2007 to 2009. He became an ambassador to Kabul on 19 October 2009.

On 17 November 2013, Öztürk replaced NATO Deputy Secretary General Hüseyin Diriöz, whose term of office expired in 2013. He was nominated but a German candidate was selected.

He served as General Manager of Multilateral Political Affairs from 1 December 2013 and 15 March 2015 and has been General Manager of International Security Affairs from 15 March 2015 and 16 October 2016.

On 17 October 2016, he served as the first civilian deputy undersecretary of the Ministry of National Defense until 9 July 2018. Öztürk became the Permanent Representative of Turkey to NATO on 15 November 2018.

Personal life
Öztürk speaks English. He is married and has two daughters.

References

Living people
1963 births
Ankara University alumni
Permanent Representatives of Turkey to NATO
Ambassadors of Turkey to Afghanistan
People from Elazığ